Deep River is an album by David Murray released on the Japanese DIW label in 1988. It features seven quartet performances by Murray with Fred Hopkins, Dave Burrell and Ralph Peterson Jr.

Reception
The Allmusic review by Brian Olewnick awarded the album 3 stars, stating: "Essential? Perhaps not, but of a piece with his generally strong work from the late '80s and a perfectly enjoyable listen."

Track listing
 "Jazz (Is Back)" (Morris) - 7:11  
 "Home" - 10:03  
 "M'Bizo" - 10:52  
 "Theme 2A" - 11:14  
 "Dakar Dance" - 5:30  
 "Mr. P.C." (Coltrane) - 12:44  
 "Deep River" (Traditional) - 5:54  
All compositions by David Murray except as indicated

Personnel
David Murray - tenor saxophone
Dave Burrell - piano
Fred Hopkins - bass
Ralph Peterson Jr. - drums

References 

1988 albums
David Murray (saxophonist) albums
DIW Records albums